Eucalyptus kumarlensis is a species of tree that is endemic to a restricted area of Western Australia. It has smooth bark, linear to narrow, curved adult leaves, flower buds in groups of seven, nine or eleven, creamy white flowers and cup-shaped, conical or hemispherical fruit.

Description
It has smooth, pink or orange and white bark on the trunk and branches. Flowering has been observed in February and the flowers are creamy white.

Taxonomy and naming
Eucalyptus kumarlensis was first formally described in 1988 by Ian Brooker, from a specimen collected west of the Coolgardie–Esperance Highway on the road to Lake King. The description was published in the journal Nuytsia. The specific epithet (kumarlensis) refers to the district where this species is found.

Distribution and habitat
This eucalypt grows on sand, calcareous loam between Kumarl and Lake Dundas north-west of Salmon Gums.

Conservation status
The Western Australian Government Department of Parks and Wildlife has classified E. kumarlensis as "not threatened".

See also

List of Eucalyptus species

References

Eucalypts of Western Australia
Trees of Australia
kumarlensis
Myrtales of Australia
Plants described in 1988
Taxa named by Ian Brooker